Giuseppe D'Angelo may refer to:
Giuseppe D'Angelo, pensioner who was killed, mistaken for Mafia boss Bartolomeo Spatola, see Salvatore Lo Piccolo#Rising tensions
Giuseppe D'Angelo (slalom canoeist) (born 1951), Italian slalom canoer